The following outline is provided as an overview of and topical guide to public affairs:

Public affairs – catch-all term that includes public policy as well as public administration, both of which are closely related to and draw upon the fields of political science and economics.

Essence of public affairs 

 Public – in public relations and communication science, the contexts of "public" are:
 Publics – groups of individuals
 The public (a.k.a."the general public") – the totality of such groups.
 Affairs – professional, personal, or public business matters.

Branches of public affairs 
 Public policy – principled guide to action taken by the administrative or executive branches of the state with regard to a class of issues in a manner consistent with law and institutional customs.  Public policy is commonly embodied "in constitutions, legislative acts, and judicial decisions."
 Public administration – implementation of government policy and an academic discipline that studies this implementation and that prepares civil servants for this work.

General public affairs concepts 
 State (polity), Sovereign state, government
 Democracy
 Monarchy
 Republic
 Security
 Crime, Criminal justice
 Civil defense, Emergency preparedness, Community emergency response teams
 Military
 Regulation, Deregulation
 Industrial policy, Investment policy, Tax, tariff and trade
 Public health, Pollution, Emissions trading
 Budget
 Socialism
 Taxation
 Technocracy
Management
Public policy degrees

References

External links 

About the industry
Public Affairs Links, an independent overview of the industry in the US and Europe
The Museum of Public Relations, a look at some of the industry's historical figures
Using market research for Public Relations, white paper from ICR
A History of Public Relations, from The Institute for Public Relations

Industry publications
PR Week , a PR trade weekly with both a US and UK edition
O'Dwyer's PR Daily, another trade publication, occasionally featuring critical essays and investigative journalism about the industry
PR News, online and offline publication that also issues PR awards, webinars and guidebooks

Industry associations and institutes
The Canadian Public Relations Society, Inc., The CPRS works to advance the professional stature of public relations and regulates its practice for the benefit and protection of the public interest.
Chartered Institute of Public Relations, the UK's leading public relations industry professional body and the largest public relations institute in Europe
Council of Public Relations Firms U.S. trade association for public relations firms
The Global Alliance, an international peak organisation with a mission to enhance the public relations profession and its practitioners throughout the world.
The Institute for Public Relations is focused on the science beneath the art of public relations
International Association of Business Communicators, an international association of 15,000 communicators, with many members from the PR profession
League of American Communications Professionals recognizes and promotes best practices within the communications industry. Resources include a free monthly newsletter; templates and how-to guides available to members; evaluation services; and competitions highlighting the best communications materials and campaigns within the industry.
Public Relations Institute of Australia, Institute for the public relations profession in Australia.
Public Relations Institute of New Zealand Institute for the public relations profession in New Zealand, advancing learning, promoting professional development and working towards a greater understanding of public relations in the wider community.
Public Relations Society of America, a professional association of public relations practitioners
Public Relations Society of India, a professional body of public relations practitioners in India

Watchdogs and critics
SourceWatch Provides background on PR agencies and practitioners.
PR Watch, critiques PR campaigns
Spinwatch, a page which monitors public relations and propaganda
CorporateWatch, a critical overview of the public relations and lobbying industry
Annenberg Political Fact Check, a nonpartisan, nonprofit consumer advocate which monitors the factual accuracy of statements by political players

Public affairs
Public affairs
Government
Public affairs
Public affairs